Steven Pacey (born 5 June 1957) is an English actor, best known for his role as Del Tarrant in the 3rd and 4th series of the science fiction series Blake's 7 from January 1980 to December 1981.

Personal life
Pacey was born in Leamington Spa, Warwickshire. In the course of Blake's 7 filming, he had a relationship with co-star Glynis Barber. He later married Joan Marine.
He has an older brother, Peter Pacey who is also an actor.

Television and film
Pacey had a regular role as Del Tarrant in Blake's 7 appearing in every episode of the third and fourth seasons of the science fiction series; he also played the role of Del's twin brother Deeta Tarrant in one episode. Other notable television appearances include playing Klaus Von Heinig in The Cedar Tree, Heartbeat, Lovejoy, M.I.T.: Murder Investigation Team, Murder in Mind, Pie in the Sky , Spooks and Whodunnit!. His film roles include Aces High (1976), Return to House on Haunted Hill (2007) and Boy A (2007).

Theatre
Pacey was nominated for an Olivier Award for the role of Bertie Wooster in the musical By Jeeves. Other West End stage appearances include Dolly West's Kitchen, The Room, Celebration, The Birthday Party, Things We Do for Love, The Phantom of the Opera, Exclusive, The Admirable Crichton, High Society, West Side Story, Mr. Cinders, Godspell, Someone Else's Shoes (Soho Theatre, 2007) and Moonlight and Magnolias (Tricycle Theatre, 2007).

Radio and audio books
Radio work includes more than 350 broadcasts, including the lead in All That Jazz. Pacey has narrated more than 200 audiobooks, including works by Joe Abercrombie, James Herbert and Martin Amis.

References

External links
 
BFI
The British Theatre Guide: Steven Pacey
StevenPacey.com

1957 births
Living people
English male film actors
English male stage actors
People from Leamington Spa
English male television actors